The Thurgoona Football Netball Club, nicknamed the Bulldogs, is an Australian rules football and netball club playing in the Tallangatta & District Football League. The club is based in Thurgoona, New South Wales

Thurgoona Football Club won their first premiership in the Albury District Football Association in 1900 defeating Black Range at Jindera Park, to win the Swain Trophy.

History 
The first recorded match involving Thurgoona FC was in 1883 when they played Wodonga FC, at Wodonga in July, 1883.

South Albury (established in 1945) who had been playing in the Tallangatta & District Football League since 1977 were struggling on and off the field tried to relocate and start afresh as Thurgoona but the move didn't eventuate forcing the club to fold in 1981.

Thurgoona F.C.
1988- NOW: Tallangatta & District Football League

Games Played
Won: 63:
Lost 295:
Drew 0:

Football Premierships
Seniors
Albury District Football Association
1: - 1900
Tallangatta & District Football League
2:  – 2016, 2017

Finals
Thurgoona have made the finals on five occasions
1993
Elimination Final: Lost to Holbrook.
1994
Elimination Final: Lost to Mitta United.
2007
Elimination Final: Won against Chiltern.
First Semi Final: Lost to Barnawatha.
2009
Elimination Final: Lost to Yackandandah.
2010
Qualifying Final: Won against Yackandandah.
2nd Semi Final: Lost to Beechworth.
Preliminary Final: Lost to Yackandandah.

Wooden Spoons
Tallangatta & District Football League
9: 1989,1990,1992,1997,1998,2000,2002,2003,2005.

References

External links
 
 Gameday website

Australian rules football clubs in New South Wales
1988 establishments in Australia
Sport in Albury, New South Wales